Three Score and Ten: A Voice to the People is a multi-CD box set album issued by Topic Records in 2009 to celebrate 70 years as an independent British record label.

The album consists of a hardback book containing the seven CDs and a paper insert detailing the Topic release list, complemented by a card insert to balance the release list.

The boxed set provides examples of recordings from the beginning of the label in 1939.  Topic Records headlines their web site as Traditional and Contemporary Folk from the British Isles but in its history many other genres have appeared on the label.  The album provides many examples including tracks from British Music Hall, blues, roots and World Music amongst others.

The album was curated, researched and produced by David Suff of Fledg'ling Records.

Promotion
David Suff gave an interview to Simon Holland for Properganda on 27 July which included details of the research and length of time involved in compiling the boxed set.  Simon then interviewed Tony Engle on 7 August  about the album and the work of Topic records.  This interview included a track from each of the CDs in the boxed set.

Mike Harding interviewed Tony Engle about the album and anniversary on 2 September 2009 on his BBC Radio 2 folk music show.

Topic Records co-hosted three concerts at London's South Bank to celebrate the 70 year anniversary and promote the boxed set.  These were held on
Friday 11 September 2009 at the Royal Festival Hall featuring The Waterson Family and the Eliza Carthy Band,
Thursday 17 September 2009 at the Queen Elizabeth Hall featuring the Martin Simpson Big Band and 
Friday 18 September 2009 at the Queen Elizabeth Hall featuring June Tabor.

There were 2 additional concerts as part of this celebration.
Saturday 19 September 2009 at the Purcell Rooms featuring Folklahoma and the Magpies Nest.
Friday 25 September 2009 at the Kalamazoo Klub at the Union Chapel, London featuring Martin Carthy and Dave Swarbrick.

Critical reception

The box set was received with much very positive comment by the general and specialist press

Commendations
Songlines review by Tim Cumming said "its one of the finest boxed sets I have ever seen".

Robin Denselow in the Guardian said "the oldest truly independent record label in the world, and the most important company in the story of British folk music, celebrates its 70th birthday this summer, and this fascinating, thoughtfully produced seven-CD set and 108-page hardback book marks the anniversary in style".

The Doug Spencer on Australian ABC Radio National's Weekend Planet said "This is one of the more remarkable boxed compilations, ever.  It has many English gems, but not only English ones".

Redlick said "This is obviously a huge labour of love and a wonderful tribute to a record label respected the world over".

Charles de Lint in the Green Man review said "This is timeless music that will undoubtedly sound just as good and relevant in another seventy years".

Awards
The album won fRoots Reissues and Compilations of the Year and Best Packaged Album of the Year in 2009.

Packaging
The package consists of a 108-page hard-backed book with 4 CDs in the front cover and 3 CDs in the back cover together with a booklet cataloguing all the recordings issued by Topic up to the publication in 2009 and a card insert to balance the recordings list.

The dust jacket shows a photograph of Louis Killen and Frankie Armstrong and the book cover shows Reg Hall and Scan Tester.

The book details the history of Topic records with a number of spotlight studies of key albums, and brief biographies relating to Topic of artists and other personnel involved in the record label from the start up to the date of issue of the album.

Hardback book

Introduction
The hardback book provides a history of Topic Records from its start as a subscription label run by the Workers Music Association issuing 78rpm shellac records, through the introduction of vinyl and its associated formats to CDs and subsequent to the boxed set the release of some of the older albums as downloads.
The book contains pictures of album covers and artists that recorded them for Topic with a chronological history of the label up to 2009.

As part of this history there are spotlight studies of classic records and short biographies of key personnel and performers.

Spotlight Studies of Classic Records

Biographies

Catalogue of releases
The catalogue details all the releases from the first record through to 2009.  Each record is assigned a number starting from 1 with a prefix that denotes the format of issue.

The catalogue details The Voice of the People series separately.

Ewan MacColl’s Radio Ballads which were originally issued by Argos are listed as they are available though Topic.

A separate section details the Topic World Series CDs.  A section details the only recording issued under the WMA heading.

Three further sections detail the Impact and String labels.

Track listing
The seven CDs are themed covering different aspects of the Topic catalogue with a title appropriate to the content.  
The composer of the track will be displayed under the track name with Traditional when appropriate.  A reference to external numbering systems for songs will be used where identified for traditional songs.  The references are from the three major numbering schemes for folk songs, the Roud Folk Song Index, Child Ballad Numbers originating from Francis James Child and the Laws Numbers from the George Malcolm Laws numbering system.
The original recordings are detailed in the listings.  Many of these were not available at the time of issue but are now available as downloads from the usual sources with the original sleeve notes being made available by Topic from their web site.

Disk one – . . . a selection of treasures from the Topic catalogue 

The disk contains a range of the music from various parts of the English speaking world that Topic Records has issued over its 70-year history.  These include English folk songs, instrumentals including dance music, American blues, music hall and a recent composition that is regularly played by Irish folk groups.  Track 2 is an instrumental issued as part of a joint album with Alexis Korner.  This track and track 4 are now available as digital downloads of either the track or the full recording. Track 3 is a dance tune played on the Jew's Harp.  Track 10 is from an album in the series "The Voice of the People" and is from a traditional English singer as is track 13.  Track 12 was originally issued by Fontana in 1969 and is licensed to Topic by Polygram through Gama Records.  The tracks are mainly from recordings issued in a variety for formats by Topic with track 15 from a Special Delivery album.

Disc two - England Arise!
The second disk contains English folk music and includes a number of traditional singers providing a link to the time when this music was the popular music of the country.  The disk has the first of two tracks from "The Sweet Primeroses".  Track 1 features an excerpt from the music used for an English folk custom dance performed each Easter in Bacup.  All the recordings were originally issued on Topic albums either vinyl or as a CD.

Disk three -  Ireland Boys, Hurrah
The third disk concentrates on the Folk music of Ireland, including traditional musicians from all the provinces.  The disk features more instrumental tracks that the other national disks. A number of the tracks were recorded outside Ireland from members of the Irish diaspora. Track 8 features an unnamed slow air before the Blackbird. Track 23 features the unusual folk music instrument the hammer dulcimer. All the recordings were originally issued on Topic 12 inch vinyl albums except track 9 which was issued on a 10-inch vinyl record.

Disk four - Scotia The Brave
This disk covers Scottish folk music with both traditional and revival artists included.  All the recordings are from Topic releases in a variety of formats from singles through vinyl albums to CDs.

Disk five - The Singer & The Song
This disk concentrates on compositions in a traditional style with the composer often singing the song.  All the recordings were issued on either Topic or Special Delivery.

Disk six - The People’s Flag
This disk covers the music that closely reflects the origins of Topic records with the Workers Music Association.  Both sides of the original record issued by Topic are featured on this disk as track 1 and track 8. Versions of track 3, Joe Hill, are the third most popular selection on the radio show Desert Island Discs for British Labour Party Politicians, with this version being selected by Ed Miliband.  Track 11 is the second track from the Sweet Primeroses album in the compilation.  The title track of the album by the Watersons is on this CD with the original album available as a download.  All the recordings were issued on either Topic or Special Delivery.

Disk seven - . . . even more treasures from the Topic catalogue
The seventh and last disk in the set contains more tracks from the Topic records catalogue and features a number from non-English speaking countries. Three of the tracks feature music from the Balkans, two of the albums collected by A. L. Lloyd and one by Wolf Dietrich.  Acts from the United States are well represented.  All the recordings were issued on Topic except track 18 which was issued on a Free Reed album. and include 1 of the Topic World Series Albums.

References

2009 compilation albums
Topic Records albums